Valley Of Lagoons is a rural locality in the Charters Towers Region, Queensland, Australia. In the  Valley Of Lagoons had a population of 48 people.

Geography
The north-eastern slopes of Boulder Mountain are the origin of the Burdekin River.  Downstream the river forms part of the eastern and southern boundary in four separate sections. Douglas Creek, a tributary of the Burdekin, also rises in the area.

History
Gugu Badhun (also known as Koko-Badun and Kokopatun) is an Australian Aboriginal language of North Queensland. The language region includes areas within the local government area of Charters Towers Region, particularly the localities of Greenvale and the Valley of Lagoons, and in the Upper Burdekin River area and in Abergowrie.

Ludwig Leichhardt and his team were the first Europeans to explore the area on 4 May 1845 on his expedition from Moreton Bay to Port Essington (now Darwin). Leichhardt was very impressed with the area saying:
"About five miles north-west by west from our camp, we discovered an en extensive valley with large lagoons and lakes, and a most luxuriant vegetation, bounded by blue distant ranges, and forming the most picturesque landscape we had yet met with. A chain of lagoons connected by a reedy brook followed the outlines of the table land, along the foot of its steep slopes. ... Water, grass, hills, mountains, plains, forest land; all the elements of a fine pasturing country, were here united."
Leichhardt uses the term "valley of lagoons" several times in his book, presumably the origin of the name.

Based on Leichhardt's favourable reports, George Elphinstone Dalrymple explored the area in 1859. Dalrymple was part of the company that established the Valley of Lagoons Station in 1862 after the area was opened up by the government. A partnership formed between Walter Jervoise Scott, his brother Arthur, Dalrymple and Robert Herbert (then Premier of Queensland) financed the acquisition of the leasehold. The partnership became Scott Bros, Dalrymple & Company with Dalrymple acting as manager.

In the  Valley Of Lagoons had a population of 48 people.

Wetlands
The  area of wetlands is on a basaltic plateau covered by an inland flood plain that hosts several large off-channel lakes that provide a permanent aquatic habitat. The area is DIWA listed and is a valuable habitat for fish and waterbirds.
The area contains a major basalt feature - the 7000 year old Kinrara lava flow - with many springs emanating from a number of locations which in turn drives permanent water flow through the area, the condition of the wetland is good.

References

External links
  (covers history of Valley of Lagoons)
 

Charters Towers Region
DIWA-listed wetlands
Localities in Queensland